Hansaplatz (German for "Hanseatic square") refers to:
a square in Berlin
Hansaplatz (Berlin U-Bahn), station in Berlin
a square in Cologne
a square in Düsseldorf
a square in Hamburg
a square in Dortmund
a square in Königsberg, now Victory Square, Kaliningrad

German words and phrases